Brandon Hobson is an American writer. His novel, Where the Dead Sit Talking, was a finalist for the National Book Award.

Career 
Hobson received his PhD in English from Oklahoma State University and teaches creative writing at New Mexico State university and at the Institute of American Indian Arts. He is an enrolled citizen of the Cherokee Nation Tribe. In 2022 he won a Guggenheim Fellowship. His fiction has won a Pushcart Prize and has appeared in Best American Short Stories 2021, McSweeney's, NOON, Conjunctions, and many other places. Writer Ottessa Moshfegh included his novel Deep Ellum on her list of six favorite books.

Honors and awards 

 2022 Guggenheim Fellowship
 2022 Western Heritage Award winner
 2020 International Dublin Literary Award longlist 
 2019 St. Francis College Literary Award, finalist
 2019 Reading the West Award winner 
 2018 National Book Award finalist 
 2016 Pushcart Prize

Books 
 The Storyteller, 2023
 The Removed, 2021
 Where the Dead Sit Talking, 2018
 Desolation of Avenues Untold, 2015
 Deep Ellum, 2014

References 

Year of birth missing (living people)
Living people
American writers
Place of birth missing (living people)
Cherokee writers
21st-century Native Americans